Altererythrobacter epoxidivorans  is a bacterium from the genus of Altererythrobacter.

References

External links
Type strain of Altererythrobacter epoxidivorans at BacDive -  the Bacterial Diversity Metadatabase

Further reading 
 

Sphingomonadales
Bacteria described in 2007